This is a list of winners and nominees of the Primetime Emmy Award for Outstanding Hairstyling for a Variety, Nonfiction or Reality Program. The category was previously awarded as Outstanding Hairstyling for a Series. In 2008, it was reorganized and multi-camera series and specials competed for their own award. The category was reclassified and renamed again in 2020.

In the following list, the first titles listed in gold are the winners; those not in gold are nominees, which are listed in alphabetical order. The years given are those in which the ceremonies took place:

Winners and nominations

1970s
Outstanding Individual Achievement in Any Area of Creative Technical Crafts

Outstanding Achievement in Hairstyling

1980s

Outstanding Hairstyling for a Series

1990s

2000s

Outstanding Hairstyling for a Multi-Camera Series or Special

2010s

2020s
Outstanding Contemporary Hairstyling for a Variety, Nonfiction or Reality Program

Programs with multiple awards

8 awards
 Saturday Night Live

3 awards
 Dancing with the Stars
 RuPaul's Drag Race

Programs with multiple nominations

17 nominations
 Saturday Night Live

15 nominations
 Dancing with the Stars

9 nominations
 The Voice

7 nominations
 MADtv

5 nominations
 RuPaul's Drag Race

3 nominations
 Key & Peele
 That '70s Show
 Two and a Half Men

2 nominations
 3rd Rock from the Sun
 The Tracey Ullman Show

References

Outstanding Hairstyling for a Variety, Nonfiction or Reality Program
Awards established in 1970
Hairdressing